Naisi (or Old Naisi) is a community in the Southern Region of Malawi, now in effect a northern suburb of the city of Zomba. 
The community lies below the Zomba Massif to the north, which may be accessed via a rough road.
Naisi is the birthplace of James Frederick Sangala, one of the founders of the Nyasaland African Congress.

References

Populated places in Southern Region, Malawi